is a Japanese actor and lead singer of the Japanese rock band ARB. He is known around the world for his roles in the Japanese horror films Suicide Club and Audition. He is also recognized in America for his role as Nakagawa in The Grudge and The Grudge 2.

Ishibashi was born in Kurume, Fukuoka, Kyūshū, Japan. He started his career by starting his own band called the ARB (Alexander Ragtime Band) in 1977. The band made their debut in 1978, and made over a dozen albums until they broke up in 1990. Ishibashi has subsequently resumed his musical activity and re-formed ARB with an album, Real Life in 1998. In 1986, Ishibashi made his movie debut in the film A-Hômansu in which ARB's 13th single "After 45" was used as its theme song. Ryo Ishibashi has been concentrating on his acting career, and has appeared in several movies outside his native country Japan, and became an internationally recognized celebrity.

He won the award for Best Actor at the 11th Yokohama Film Festival for A Sign Days and at the 5th Japan Film Professional Awards he took the Best Actor award for his role as a yakuza hitman in Another Lonely Hitman.

Ishibashi has been married to Mieko Harada since 1987 and has three children.

Filmography

Films
 A Homansu (1986)
 A Sign Days (1989)
 American Yakuza (1993)
 Blue Tiger (1994)
 Natural Woman (1994)
 Another Lonely Hitman (1995)
 Back to Back (1996)
 Kids Return (1996)
 Audition (1999)
 Brother (2000)
 Suicide Club (2002)
 Moon Child (2003)
 The Grudge (2004)
 The Grudge 2 (2006)
 Shamo (2007)
 War (2007) – Shiro Yanagawa
 Ace Attorney (2012)
 Persona Non Grata (2015) – Chūichi Ōhashi
 Masquerade Hotel (2019) – Fujiki
 Dancing Mary (2020)
 The Cinderella Addiction (2021) – Masaaki Fukuura
 Masquerade Night (2021) – Fujiki
 Parasite in Love (2021) – Urizane

Television
 Takeda Shingen (1988) – Oda Nobunaga
 Nemureru Mori (1998) – Detective Onda
 Ryōmaden (2010) – Asahina Masahiro
 Man of Destiny (2012) – Takashi Anzai
 Mikaiketsu Jiken: File. 05 (2016) – Kakuei Tanaka
 Smoking (2018) – Uncle Sabe
 The Naked Director (2019) – Ikezawa
 Awaiting Kirin (2020) – Takeda Shingen
 Modern Love Tokyo (2022) – Kōsuke Hayami

References

External links 
 
 Ryo Ishibashi Official Website (actor)
 Ryo Ishiabshi Official Website (singer)

1956 births
Actors from Fukuoka Prefecture
Japanese male film actors
Japanese male rock singers
Japanese male television actors
Living people
Musicians from Fukuoka Prefecture
People from Kurume
20th-century Japanese male actors
21st-century Japanese male actors
20th-century Japanese male singers
20th-century Japanese singers
21st-century Japanese male singers
21st-century Japanese singers